Scott County Jail Complex located in Georgetown, Kentucky served as the Scott County jail from 1892 until 1990. Currently, the building houses the Scott County Arts & Cultural Center.

The building is designated a Kentucky Landmark.  It was listed on the National Register of Historic Places in 2002.

The  Jailer's Dwelling, built in 1892, is a brick Italianate-style two-story three-bay building on stone foundation.

References

External links
Scott County Arts & Cultural Center official web site.

:

Buildings and structures in Georgetown, Kentucky
National Register of Historic Places in Scott County, Kentucky
Tourist attractions in Scott County, Kentucky
Jails on the National Register of Historic Places in Kentucky
County government buildings in Kentucky
Arts centers in Kentucky
Italianate architecture in Kentucky